The Nero Redivivus legend was a belief popular during the last part of the 1st century that the Roman emperor Nero would return after his death in 68 AD. The legend was a common belief as late as the 5th century.  The belief was either the result or cause of several imposters who posed as Nero leading rebellions.

Several variations of the legend exist, playing on both hope and fear of Nero's return.  The earliest written version of this legend is found in the Sibylline Oracles. It claims that Nero did not really die but fled to Parthia, where he would amass a large army and would return to Rome to destroy it.  Dio Chrysostom, a Greek philosopher and historian, wrote "seeing that even now everybody wishes [Nero] were still alive. And the great majority do believe that he still is, although in a certain sense he has died not once but often along with those who had been firmly convinced that he was still alive."  Augustine of Hippo wrote that some believed "he now lives in concealment in the vigor of that same age which he had reached when he was believed to have perished, and will live until he is revealed in his own time and restored to his kingdom."  In later forms of the legend, among many early Christians, this legend shifted to a belief that Nero was the Antichrist.

Nero impostors
At least three Nero impostors emerged leading rebellions. The first, who sang and played the cithara or lyre and whose face was similar to that of the dead emperor, appeared in 69 during the reign of Vitellius. During the reign of Titus (c 79–81) there was another impostor, who appeared in Asia and also sang to the accompaniment of the lyre and looked like Nero but he, too, was exposed. Twenty years after Nero's death, during the reign of Domitian, there was a third pretender. Supported by the Parthians, who hardly could be persuaded to give him up, the matter almost came to war.

Some Bible scholars see the description of the wounding and healing of the Beast in Revelation 13:3 and the mention of the eighth king who is also one of the earlier seven kings in Revelation 17:8-11 as allusions to the Nero Redivivus legend.

See also 

 Pseudo-Nero

Notes

Nero
King asleep in mountain